Esmeraldas is the word for 'emeralds' in Portuguese and Spanish. It may refer to:

Brazil
Esmeraldas, Minas Gerais
Ecuador
Esmeraldas, Ecuador
Esmeraldas River
Esmeraldas Province
Esmeraldas Canton

See also